The Ukrainian Cup 1999–2000 was the ninth annual edition of Ukraine's football knockout competition, known as the Ukrainian Cup. The winner of this competition was Dynamo Kyiv, beating FC Kryvbas Kryvyi Rih in the final.

The format of competition was completely changed. The competition itself started on March 11, 2000 with 32 teams: 16 from the Premier League, 14 from the First League, and both finalists of the Second League cup. The Second League Cup took place in the late 1999 involving some 44 teams out which two finalists qualified for the Ukrainian Cup. Those finalists later also played a final game for the competition's trophy in May 2000.

Round and draw dates
All draws held at FFU headquarters (Building of Football) in Kyiv unless stated otherwise.

Competition schedule

First round 

Notes:

Second round

Quarterfinals 

Notes:

Semifinals 

Notes:

Final

See also
 1999–2000 Ukrainian Second League Cup

Ukrainian Cup seasons
Cup
Ukrainian Cup